The Balochistan Bar Council is a statutory & deliberative assembly of lawyers in Balochistan for safeguarding the rights, interests and privileges of practicing lawyers, within Balochistan province of Pakistan. The Council also regulates the conduct of lawyers and helps in the administration of justice. It has been constituted by Section 3(ii) of the Legal Practitioners and Bar Councils Act, 1973 of Constitution of Pakistan. All lower court and Balochistan High Court lawyers within Balochistan are licensed with this council.

Composition
The Balochistan Bar Council consists of Chairman Executive Committee &  Vice Chairman, both elected by Members of Balochistan Bar Council each year and these Members are elected by the advocates from different constituencies across the Balochistan Province. Members serve a term of five years, beginning on January 1, with elections held each November to fill seats of those whose terms will expire in the following January. The Advocate General of Balochistan acts as ex officio Chairman of Balochistan Bar Council.

Targeted Killing

On 8 August 2016, the President of the Bar Association, Bilal Anwar Kasi, was assassinated on his way to the courthouse in Quetta. After his body was brought to the city's Government Hospital, a suicide bomber attacked the hospital. The attack killed more than 90 people, who were mostly legal colleagues from the Bar Association who had come to mourn the death, and injured at least 50 people.

See also
 List of Pakistani Lawyers
 Pakistan Bar Council
 Punjab Bar Council

References

Bar Councils in Pakistan
Organisations based in Balochistan, Pakistan
Balochistan High Court